Oh Ah-yeon is a South Korean actress and model. She is known for roles in dramas, Search: WWW, Mr. Sunshine and she also appeared in movies such as Gonjiam: Haunted Asylum and Heart Blackened.

Filmography

Television series

Film

TV Movies

References

External links 
 
 
 

1992 births
Living people
21st-century South Korean actresses
South Korean female models
South Korean television actresses
South Korean film actresses
South Korean web series actresses